The Best of Everything but the Girl is a compilation album by English musical duo Everything but the Girl, released in 1996.

Track listing
"Missing" (Todd Terry Remix) from Amplified Heart
"Driving" (Todd Terry Remix) Previously unreleased mix
"Old Friends" from Worldwide
"One Place" from Worldwide
"I Don't Want to Talk About It" from Idlewild
"Love Is Strange" from Acoustic
"The Only Living Boy in New York" from Home Movies
"Apron Strings" from Idlewild
"When All's Well" from Love Not Money
"Another Bridge" from Eden
"Each and Every One" from Eden
"Rollercoaster" from Amplified Heart
"Driving" (The Underdog Remix) Previously unreleased mix
"Better Things" (Massive Attack with Tracey Thorn) from Protection
"Protection" (Massive Attack with Tracey Thorn) from Protection

Charts

Certifications

References

Everything but the Girl compilation albums
1996 greatest hits albums
Blanco y Negro Records compilation albums